Cyclamen is a genus of 23 species of perennial flowering plants in the family Primulaceae.

Cyclamen may also refer to:
 Cyclamen (color), a shade of purple
 Cyclamen (film), a 1916 Hungarian silent film

See also
 Ciklamen, an 1883 novel by Slovenian author Janko Kersnik
 Cyclamen aldehyde, a fragrance molecule
 Cyclomen (disambiguation)